Rowland Hall (RHSM) (formerly Rowland Hall-St. Mark's) is an independent school of 945 students from preschool to high school on two campuses in Salt Lake City, Utah. The current headmaster is Mick Gee. There are 100 teachers, with approximately 32 high school teachers. Founded in 1867, Rowland Hall is the oldest school in Utah.

History 

Rowland Hall traces its roots to St. Mark's School, which was founded in Salt Lake City by Episcopal Bishop Daniel Sylvester Tuttle in 1867. In support of newly established public schools in the Utah Territory, St. Mark's School was closed in the early 1890s. However its sister school, Rowland Hall, remained open.

Rowland Hall has operated as a school continuously since St. Marks was founded by Bishop Tuttle in 1867. Rowland Hall opened in 1880 as a boarding school for girls from ranches in neighboring states; the school opened on the First Avenue campus in Salt Lake City.  The historic building was originally a home built by George D. Watt in about 1862. Rowland Hall is the oldest school in continuous operation in Utah, predating the establishment of public schools in the Utah territory. During the Great Depression of the 1930s, when the Episcopal Diocese of Utah could no longer afford to support the school, graduates and parents assumed financial responsibility and reorganized Rowland Hall as an independent school.

In 1956, St. Mark's re-opened as an independent day school for boys in two historic houses and a so-called tin shed that were located next door to Rowland Hall, sharing the same city block. St. Mark's merged with Rowland Hall in 1964 to become Rowland Hall-St. Mark's, an independent coeducational school.

The Middle and Upper Schools moved to the Lincoln Street Campus in 1984. The Lower and Beginning Schools moved to the McCarthey Campus on Guardsman Way in 2002. The historic campus on First Avenue was sold to the Madeleine Choir School.

Campus 
Rowland Hall is currently housed on two campuses in Salt Lake City. The Beginning School and Lower School are on the McCarthey Campus, located at 720 Guardsman Way in Salt Lake City, a few blocks from the University of Utah. The Middle School and Upper School are located just over a mile away in a renovated public school building on Lincoln Street.

In 2013, Rowland Hall broke ground on a new campus that will one day house all divisions: the Richard R. Steiner Campus. Soccer fields on the new campus were finished in the spring of 2014. The 13.2-acre property that will house the new campus for the Middle School, Upper School, and athletics complex is immediately adjacent to the western edge of the existing McCarthey Campus.

Academics
The average class size is 15 and student to teacher ratio is 10:1. 54% of faculty have advanced degrees. Faculty members have an average of 17 years teaching experience in the classroom.

Arts 
Arts are taught by faculty who are professional directors, dancers, visual artists, musicians, and writers. Visual art and music are integrated throughout the curriculum. The school offers additional formal instruction and training starting in the Lower School. The Middle School and Upper School arts programs include formal dance, dramatic and musical theater, visual art, ceramics, and music opportunities through the orchestra, choral group, jazz bands, and chamber groups.

Sports
The Rowmark Ski Academy was founded in 1982 as part of Rowland Hall's upper school. It offers a combination of academics and complete year-round competitive ski racing program for its student-athletes, who train at Park City Mountain Resort’s 2002 Olympic Race Arena. Seventeen Rowmark athletes have been named to the U.S. Ski Team including Breezy Johnson, Alice McKennis, Andy Phillips, Erik Fisher, Keely Kelleher and Robert Saunders. Other notable Rowland Hall alumni include Hilary Lindh, Picabo Street, James "Gerbs" Bauer and Levi Leipheimer.

Rowland Hall has 14 sports teams in the Upper School and six sports teams in the Middle School. Rowland Hall’s Upper School is classified as a Division 2A school in Region 17 of the Utah High School Activities Association (UHSAA). Middle School student-athletes compete in the Wasatch Athletic Conference.

The school's Winged Lions have won 29 state championship titles and 64 region titles since 2007; the 2017-2018 2A Directors Cup for success in sportsmanship, academics, and state tournaments; and the annual UHSAA Sportsmanship Award.

Debate
Rowland Hall is recognized as a National Speech and Debate Association (NSDA) School of Excellence. In the last five years, Rowland Hall Debate has produced seven State Champions, 19 National Qualifiers, and 14 Academic All-Americans, and has sent dozens of students to college on scholarships. NSDA named debate coach Mike Shackelford Utah's Educator of the Year in 2017 and Policy Debate Coach in 2014. The high school team is made up of approximately 50 debaters who participate in a variety of events, styles, and divisions, attending 10 to 12 tournaments a year and may travel all over the country.

The school has a total of 13 bids to the 2015 and 2016 Tournament of Champions, 9 bids to the 2010 Tournament of Champions and 7 bids to the 2008 TOC. The RHSM top team reached quarterfinals of the 2008 and 2010 TOC, the best finish for any Utah team in the state's history. In 2015, 2 RHSM teams made it to the octafinals, making the school the only one to clear two teams at the TOC.  In 2019, Rowland Hall reached the semifinals of the TOC, which is the best finish for a Utah school ever. Additionally, the team recorded the best finish ever for a Utah school at NFL Nationals, taking 3rd place in June 2009, and 2nd place in 2010. A similar record was set in the 2015 National Debate Coaches' Association Championship, which ended with RHSM taking 3rd place.

Notable people

Alumni
Maggie Behle, alpine skier
Nancy Borgenicht, actress
Levi Leipheimer, cyclist
Picabo Street, alpine ski racer
Alex Wubbels, nurse and former Olympian

Faculty
E. Otis Charles, 8th Bishop of Utah
Daniel S. Tuttle, 13th Presiding Bishop of the Episcopal Church

References

External links
 

Private high schools in Utah
Private middle schools in Utah
Private elementary schools in Utah
School buildings on the National Register of Historic Places in Utah
Educational institutions established in 1880
Schools in Salt Lake City
Preparatory schools in Utah
1880 establishments in Utah Territory
National Register of Historic Places in Salt Lake City